Chiang Ming-han (born 6 October 1986) is a Taiwanese footballer who currently plays as a defender for the national and club level.

References

1986 births
Living people
Taiwanese footballers
Chinese Taipei international footballers
Taiwan Power Company F.C. players
Association football defenders
Footballers from Kaohsiung